Mohsen Mohammadseifi (born 8 September 1989 in Zanjan) is an Iranian wushu athlete. He won the gold medal at the 2010 Asian Games in Guangzhou and 2014 Asian Games in Incheon, South Korea.
He won the 1st place at the 2018 Asian Games in Jakarta, Indonesia. He won 5 wushu world championships gold medals between 2011 and 2019.

Mixed martial arts record

|-
|Win
|align=center| 1–2
|Bichi Zakaria
|TKO (punches)
|Brave CF 48
|
|align=center|1
|align=center|0:43
|Arad, Bahrain
|
|-
|Loss
|align=center| 0–2
|Rong Zhu
|KO (punches)
|WLF W.A.R.S. 35
|
|align=center|1
|align=center|2:50
|Zhengzhou, China
|
|-
|Loss
|align=center| 0–1
|Eltaj Hasanov
|Submission
|Ased FC 5
|
|align=center|3
|align=center|1:07
|Baku, Azerbaijan
|

External links 

 Mohammadseifi on Instagram

References 

1989 births
Living people
Iranian male mixed martial artists
Mixed martial artists utilizing sanshou
Iranian wushu practitioners
Iranian sanshou practitioners
Asian Games gold medalists for Iran
Asian Games medalists in wushu
Wushu practitioners at the 2010 Asian Games
Wushu practitioners at the 2014 Asian Games
Wushu practitioners at the 2018 Asian Games
People from Zanjan, Iran
Medalists at the 2010 Asian Games
Medalists at the 2014 Asian Games
Medalists at the 2018 Asian Games
World Games medalists in wushu
Islamic Solidarity Games competitors for Iran
21st-century Iranian people